The at sign, is normally read aloud as "at"; it is also commonly called the at symbol, commercial at, or address sign. It is used as an accounting and invoice abbreviation meaning "at a rate of" (e.g. 7 widgets @ £2 per widget = £14), but it is now seen more widely in email addresses and social media platform handles.

The absence of a single English word for the symbol has prompted some writers to use the French arobase or Spanish and Portuguese arroba, or to coin new words such as ampersat and asperand, or the (visual) onomatopoeia strudel, but none of these have achieved wide use.  

Although not included on the keyboard of the earliest commercially successful typewriters, it was on at least one 1889 model and the very successful Underwood models from the "Underwood No. 5" in 1900 onward. It started to be used in email addresses in the 1970s, and is now routinely included on most types of computer keyboards.

History

The earliest yet discovered symbol in this shape is found in a Bulgarian translation of a Greek chronicle written by Constantinos Manasses in 1345. Held today in the Vatican Apostolic Library, it features the @ symbol in place of the capital letter alpha "Α" as an initial in the word Amen; however, the reason behind it being used in this context is still unknown. The evolution of the symbol as used today is not recorded.

It has long been used in Catalan, Spanish and Portuguese as an abbreviation of arroba, a unit of weight equivalent to 25 pounds, and derived from the Arabic expression of "the quarter" ( pronounced ar-rubʿ). A symbol resembling an @ is found in the Spanish "Taula de Ariza", a registry to denote a wheat shipment from Castile to Aragon, in 1448. An Italian academic, Giorgio Stabile, claims to have traced the @ symbol to the 16th century, in a mercantile document sent by Florentine Francesco Lapi from Seville to Rome on May 4, 1536. The document is about commerce with Pizarro, in particular the price of an @ of wine in Peru. Currently, the word arroba means both the at-symbol and a unit of weight. In Venetian, the symbol was interpreted to mean amphora, a unit of weight and volume based upon the capacity of the standard amphora jar since the 6th century.

Modern use

Commercial usage
In contemporary English usage, @ is a commercial symbol, meaning at and at the rate of or at the price of. It has rarely been used in financial ledgers, and is not used in standard typography.

Trademark
In 2012, "@" was registered as a trademark with the German Patent and Trade Mark Office. A cancellation request was filed in 2013, and the cancellation was ultimately confirmed by the German Federal Patent Court in 2017.

Email addresses
A common contemporary use of @ is in email addresses (using the SMTP system), as in jdoe@example.com (the user jdoe located at the domain example.com). Ray Tomlinson of BBN Technologies is credited for having introduced this usage in 1971. This idea of the symbol representing located at in the form user@host is also seen in other tools and protocols; for example, the Unix shell command ssh jdoe@example.net tries to establish an ssh connection to the computer with the hostname example.net using the username jdoe.

On web pages, organizations often obscure the email addresses of their members or employees by omitting the @. This practice, known as address munging, makes the email addresses less vulnerable to spam programs that scan the internet for them.

Social media

On some social media platforms and forums, usernames may be prefixed with an @ (in the form @johndoe); this type of username is frequently referred to as a "handle".

On online forums without threaded discussions, @ is commonly used to denote a reply; for instance: @Jane to respond to a comment Jane made earlier. Similarly, in some cases, @ is used for "attention" in email messages originally sent to someone else. For example, if an email was sent from Catherine to Steve, but in the body of the email, Catherine wants to make Keirsten aware of something, Catherine will start the line  to indicate to Keirsten that the following sentence concerns her. This also helps with mobile email users who might not see bold or color in email.

In microblogging (such as on Twitter and GNU social-based microblogs), an @ before the user name is used to send publicly readable replies (e.g. @otheruser: Message text here). The blog and client software can automatically interpret these as links to the user in question. When included as part of a person's or company's contact details, an @ symbol followed by a name is normally understood to refer to a Twitter handle. A similar use of the @ symbol was also made available to Facebook users on September 15, 2009. In Internet Relay Chat (IRC), it is shown before users' nicknames to denote they have operator status on a channel.

Sports usage

In American English the @ can be used to add information about a sporting event. Where opposing sports teams have their names separated by a "v" (for versus), the away team can be written first – and the normal "v" replaced with @ to convey at which team's home field the game will be played. This usage is not followed in British English, since conventionally the home team is written first.

Computer languages
@ is used in various programming languages and other computer languages, although there is not a consistent theme to its usage. For example:
 In ALGOL 68, the @ symbol is brief form of the at keyword; it is used to change the lower bound of an array. For example:  refers to an array starting at index 88.
 In ActionScript, @ is used in XML parsing and traversal as a string prefix to identify attributes in contrast to child elements.
 In the ASP.NET MVC Razor template markup syntax, the @ character denotes the start of code statement blocks or the start of text content.
 In Dyalog APL, @ is used as a functional way to modify or replace data at specific locations in an array.
 In CSS, @ is used in special statements outside of a CSS block.
 In C#, it denotes "verbatim strings", where no characters are escaped and two double-quote characters represent a single double-quote. As a prefix it also allows keywords to be used as identifiers, a form of stropping.
 In D, it denotes function attributes: like: @safe, @nogc, user defined @('from_user') which can be evaluated at compile time (with __traits) or @property to declare properties, which are functions that can be syntactically treated as if they were fields or variables.
 In DIGITAL Command Language, the @ character was the command used to execute a command procedure. To run the command procedure VMSINSTAL.COM, one would type @VMSINSTAL at the command prompt.
 In Forth, it is used to fetch values from the address on the top of the stack. The operator is pronounced as "fetch".
 In Haskell, it is used in so-called as-patterns. This notation can be used to give aliases to patterns, making them more readable.
 in HTML, it can be encoded as &commat;
 In J, denotes function composition.
 In Java, it has been used to denote annotations, a kind of metadata, since version 5.0.
 In LiveCode, it is prefixed to a parameter to indicate that the parameter is passed by reference.
 In an LXDE autostart file (as used, for example, on the Raspberry Pi computer), @ is prefixed to a command to indicate that the command should be automatically re-executed if it crashes.
 In ML, it denotes list concatenation.
 In modal logic, specifically when representing possible worlds, @ is sometimes used as a logical symbol to denote the actual world (the world we are "at").
 In Objective-C, @ is prefixed to language-specific keywords such as @implementation and to form string literals.
 In Pascal, @ is the "address of" operator (it tells the location at which a variable is found).
This use is known as a sigil.
 In PHP, it is used just before an expression to make the interpreter suppress errors that would be generated from that expression.
 In Python 2.4 and up, it is used to decorate a function (wrap the function in another one at creation time). In Python 3.5 and up, it is also used as an overloadable matrix multiplication operator.
In Razor, it is used for C# code blocks.
 In Ruby, it functions as a sigil: @ prefixes instance variables, and @@ prefixes class variables.
 In Scala, it is used to denote annotations (as in Java), and also to bind names to subpatterns in pattern-matching expressions.
 In Swift, @ prefixes "annotations" that can be applied to classes or members. Annotations tell the compiler to apply special semantics to the declaration like keywords, without adding keywords to the language.
 In T-SQL, @ prefixes variables and @@ prefixes "niladic" system functions.
 In several xBase-type programming languages, like DBASE, FoxPro/Visual FoxPro and Clipper, it is used to denote position on the screen. For example:  to show the word "HELLO" in line 1, column 1.
 In FoxPro/Visual FoxPro, it is also used to indicate explicit pass by reference of variables when calling procedures or functions (but it is not an address operator).
 In a Windows Batch file, an @ at the start of a line suppresses the echoing of that command. In other words, is the same as ECHO OFF applied to the current line only. Normally a Windows command is executed and takes effect from the next line onward, but @ is a rare example of a command that takes effect immediately. It is most commonly used in the form  which not only switches off echoing but prevents the command line itself from being echoed.
 In Windows PowerShell, @ is used as array operator for array and hash table literals and for enclosing here-string literals.
(Ex: wikipedia.org vs. www.wikipedia.org)
 In assembly language, @ is sometimes used as a dereference operator.

Gender neutrality in Spanish 

In Spanish, where many words end in "-o" when in the masculine gender and end "-a" in the feminine, @ is sometimes used as a gender-neutral substitute for the default "o" ending. For example, the word amigos traditionally represents not only male friends, but also a mixed group, or where the genders are not known. The proponents of gender-inclusive language would replace it with amig@s in these latter two cases, and use amigos only when the group referred to is all-male and amigas only when the group is all female. The Real Academia Española disapproves of this usage.

Other uses and meanings

 In (especially English) scientific and technical literature, @ is used to describe the conditions under which data are valid or a measurement has been made. E.g. the density of saltwater may read d = 1.050 g/cm3 @ 15 °C (read "at" for @), density of a gas d = 0.150 g/L @ 20 °C, 1 bar, or noise of a car 81 dB @ 80 km/h (speed).
In philosophical logic, '@' is used to denote the actual world (in contrast to non-actual possible worlds). Analogously, a 'designated' world in a Kripke model may be labelled '@'.
 In chemical formulae, @ is used to denote trapped atoms or molecules. For instance, La@C60 means lanthanum inside a fullerene cage. See article Endohedral fullerene for details.
 In Malagasy, @ is an informal abbreviation for the prepositional form amin'ny.
 In Malay, @ is an informal abbreviation for the word "atau", meaning "or" in English.
 In genetics, @ is the abbreviation for locus, as in IGL@ for immunoglobulin lambda locus.
 In the Koalib language of Sudan, @ is used as a letter in Arabic loanwords. The Unicode Consortium rejected a proposal to encode it separately as a letter in Unicode. SIL International uses Private Use Area code points U+F247 and U+F248 for lowercase and capital versions, although they have marked this PUA representation as deprecated since September 2014.
 A schwa, as the actual schwa character "ə" may be difficult to produce on many computers. It is used in this capacity in some ASCII IPA schemes, including SAMPA and X-SAMPA.
 In leet it may substitute for the letter "A".
 It is frequently used in typing and text messaging as an abbreviation for "at".
 In Portugal it may be used in typing and text messaging with the meaning "french kiss" (linguado).
 In online discourse, @ is used by some anarchists as a substitute for the traditional circle-A.
 Algebraic notation for the Crazyhouse chess variant: An @ between a piece and a square denotes a piece dropped onto that square from the player's reserve.

Names in other languages
In many languages other than English, although most typewriters included the symbol, the use of @ was less common before email became widespread in the mid-1990s. Consequently, it is often perceived in those languages as denoting "the Internet", computerization, or modernization in general. Naming the symbol after animals is also common.
 In Afrikaans, it is called , meaning 'monkey tail', similarly to the Dutch use of the word ( is the word for 'monkey' or 'ape' in Dutch,  comes from the Dutch ).
 In Belarusian, it is called  (meaning 'helix' or 'snail').
 In Chinese:
Nowadays, for most of China's youth, it is called  (pronounced ), which is a phonetic transcription of at.
 In Hong Kong and Macau, it is at.
 In Croatian, it is most often referred to by the English word at (pronounced et), and less commonly and more formally, with the preposition  (with the addressee in the nominative case, not locative as per usual rection of ), meaning 'at', '' or 'by'. Note that the Croatian words for monkey,  are not used to denote the symbol, except seldom the latter words regionally. 
 In Czech it is called , which means 'rollmops'; the same word is used in Slovak.
It is not used for prices, where in Danish  means 'at (per piece)'.
 In Dutch, it is called  ('monkey's tail'). However, the use of the English at has become increasingly popular in Dutch.
 In Estonian, it is called , from the English word at.
Nowadays, it is officially , according to the national standardization institute SFS; frequently also spelled .
Its origin is the same as that of the Spanish word, which could be derived from the Arabic . In France, it is also common (especially for younger generations) to say the English word at when spelling out an email address. In everyday Québec French, one often hears  when sounding out an e-mail address, while TV and radio hosts are more likely to use . 
 In Greek, it is called  meaning 'duckling'.
 In Greenlandic, an Inuit language, it is called  meaning 'A-like' or 'something that looks like A'.
 In Hungarian, it is called  (a playful synonym for 'worm' or 'maggot').
 In Indian English, speakers often say at the rate of (with e-mail addresses quoted as "example at the rate of example.com").
 In Indonesian, it is usually .
 In Japanese, it is called  (from the English words at mark).
 In Kazakh, it is officially called  ('moon's ear').
 In Korean, it is called  (meaning 'whelk'), a dialectal form of whelk.
 In Kurdish, it is at or et (Latin Hawar script),  (Perso-Arabic Sorani script) coming from the English word at.
 In Lithuanian, it is pronounced  (equivalent to the English at).
 In Luxembourgish it used to be called  ('monkey tail'), but due to widespread use, it is now called , as in English.
 In Macedonian, it is called  ('little monkey').
 In Malaysia, it is called  when it is used in names and  when it is used in email addresses,  being the Malay word for 'at'. It is also commonly used to abbreviate  which means 'or', 'either'.
 In Morse code, it is known as a "commat", consisting of the Morse code for the "A" and "C" which run together as one character: . The symbol was added in 2004 for use with email addresses, the only official change to Morse code since World War I.
 In Nepali, the symbol is called "at the rate." Commonly, people will give their email addresses by including the phrase "at the rate".
Sometimes , the Swedish/Danish name (which means 'trunk A', as in 'elephant's trunk'), is used. Commonly, people will call the symbol  (as in English), particularly when giving their email addresses. The computer manufacturer Norsk Data used it as the command prompt, and it was often called "grisehale" (pig's tail).
 In Polish, it is commonly called  ('monkey'). Rarely, the English word at is used. 
 In Portuguese, it is called  (from the Arabic). The word  is also used for a weight measure in Portuguese. This naming is because the at sign was used to represent this measure.
The latter is commonly used, and it comes from the word round (from its shape), but that is nothing like the mathematical symbol  (rounded A).

 In Russian, it is commonly called  ( – '[little] dog').
 In Slovak, it is called  ('rollmop', a pickled fish roll, as in Czech).
 In Slovenian, it is called  (an informal word for 'monkey').
 In Spanish-speaking countries, it is called  (from the Arabic , which denotes a pre-metric unit of weight.
 In Sámi (North Sámi), it is called  meaning 'cat's tail'.
 In Swedish, it is called  ('elephant's trunk A') or simply , as in the English language.
 In Swiss German, it is commonly called  ('monkey-tail'). However, the use of the English word  has become increasingly popular in Swiss German, as with Standard German.
 In Tagalog, the word  means 'and', so the symbol is used like an ampersand in colloquial writing such as text messages (e.g. , 'cook and eat').
 In Thai, it is commonly called , as in English.
 In Turkish, it is commonly called , a variant pronunciation of English at.
 In Ukrainian, it is commonly called  ( – 'at') or Равлик (ravlyk), which means 'snail'.

Unicode
The named entity &commat; was introduced in HTML5.

Variants

See also
 ASCII
 Circle-A
 Enclosed A (Ⓐ, ⓐ)
 Unicode

References

External links

 
 "The Accidental History of the @ Symbol ", Smithsonian magazine, September 2012, Retrieved October 2021.
 The @-symbol, part 1, intermission, part 2, addenda, Shady Characters ⌂ The secret life of punctuation August 2011, Retrieved June 2013.
 "Daniel Soar on @", London Review of Books, Vol. 31 No. 10, 28 May 2009, Retrieved June 2013.
 ascii64 – the @ book – free download (creative commons) – by patrik sneyd – foreword by luigi colani) November 2006, Retrieved June 2013.
 A Natural History of the @ Sign The many names of the at sign in various languages, 1997, Retrieved June 2013.
 Sum: the @ Symbol, LINGUIST List 7.968 July 1996, Retrieved June 2013.
 Where it's At: names for a common symbol World Wide Words August 1996, Retrieved June 2013.

Latin-script ligatures
Typographical symbols
Graphemes
Punctuation